Josip Maganjić (born 6 January 1999) is a Croatian professional footballer who plays as a forward for second tier-club NK Solin.

Club career
Born in nearby Sinj, Maganjić started his youth career at the local NK Junak Sinj, moving for two seasons to nearby NK Glavice, aged 10, at the age of 12, he returned to Junak, but got called up by Hajduk Split only a season later. He found his place in the team quickly, becoming an U-15 youth international during his first season at the club. In 2016, as an U-17 youth international and considered to be one of the top players in the country in his age bracket, he was called up to the senior team that was missing 14 players for the last game of the season, along with Ardian Ismajli and Hrvoje Relota. He made his first team debut thereby at 14 May 2016 in a 3–2 away win against NK Zagreb, replaced in the 65th minute due to injury by Ivan Prskalo.

References

External links

1999 births
Living people
People from Sinj
Association football forwards
Croatian footballers
Croatia youth international footballers
HNK Hajduk Split players
NK Istra 1961 players
NK Široki Brijeg players
NK Dugopolje players
NK Solin players
Croatian Football League players
Premier League of Bosnia and Herzegovina players
First Football League (Croatia) players
Croatian expatriate footballers
Expatriate footballers in Italy
Croatian expatriate sportspeople in Italy
Expatriate footballers in Bosnia and Herzegovina
Croatian expatriate sportspeople in Bosnia and Herzegovina